Robert Hickey (born 12 January 1974) is a New Zealand basketball player. He competed in the men's tournament at the 2000 Summer Olympics. He played for the Otago Nuggets at the time of his selection for the Olympic squad. In 2002, he signed for the Hawke's Bay Hawks. He retired from international basketball in 2003 after representing New Zealand more than 50 times.

References

External links
 

1974 births
Living people
New Zealand men's basketball players
Olympic basketball players of New Zealand
Basketball players at the 2000 Summer Olympics
Sportspeople from Whakatāne
2002 FIBA World Championship players